Climping Beach is a  biological Site of Special Scientific Interest west of Littlehampton in West Sussex. The eastern half is designated a Local Nature Reserve called West Beach. 

This stretch of shoreline has sand dunes at the back with a vegetated shingle beach, which is a nationally uncommon habitat, in front. The intertidal zone has soft muds and sands with many invertebrates, which are an important source of food for wintering birds, especially sanderling.

References

Local Nature Reserves in West Sussex 
Sites of Special Scientific Interest in West Sussex